The Enterprise Building is a historic commercial building located at High Point, Guilford County, North Carolina.  It was built in 1935, and is a three-story, five bay, brick building with a full cast stone Art Deco-style façade.  It was originally built as a two-story building and enlarged to three stories in 1945.

It was listed on the National Register of Historic Places in 2014.

References

Commercial buildings on the National Register of Historic Places in North Carolina
Art Deco architecture in North Carolina
Commercial buildings completed in 1935
Buildings and structures in Guilford County, North Carolina
National Register of Historic Places in Guilford County, North Carolina